Jayson Sherlock (born 1970) is a Christian metal musician from Australia. He began his career in the Australian death metal band Mortification, which was considered to be a major pioneer in the genre. Sherlock was the founder of the one-man project unblack metal band Horde, in which he played every instrument. He has also been in other bands such as Paramaecium, inExordium, Altera Enigma, and Soundscape. During 2012, he was the drummer for Deliverance. He is currently the drummer for the death metal band Revulsed.

Biography

Style
Sherlock is known for his unique and extremely fast double bass pedal and blast beat technique. He also plays guitar and bass. Sherlock is left-handed.

Mortification

In 1990 Sherlock joined Mortification after Steve Rowe disbanded LightForce, established the new band and released Mortification's debut album Break the Curse. Then came the self-titled album Mortification. Mortification changed to a more death metal style in 1992 and subsequently released the groundbreaking album Scrolls of the Megilloth. Mortification then released another album titled Post Momentary Affliction and the live album Live Planetarium. During this time Mortification was said to belong to the elite of the death metal movement and Sherlock had a notable role in the band as he wrote some of the more well-known songs such as "Terminate Damnation". Scrolls is widely noted as a piece of Australian metal history and a classic of the genre. After releasing these albums, Sherlock left Mortification in 1993 to join the doom metal band Paramaecium.

Paramaecium

In 1993 Paramaecium released their debut album Exhumed of the Earth, which was considered to be one of the greatest Christian doom metal albums of the time. After the success of its previous album, the band proceeded to release the concept album Within the Ancient Forest, based on a book written by the band's vocalist Andrew Tompkins. According to Doom-metal.com, Paramaecium "are the only Christian death doom band that made it to the top of the genre." After the success of Paramaecium, Sherlock left the band in 1996.

Horde

After a year of being a part of Paramaecium, Sherlock formed the one-man band Horde. He released the album Hellig Usvart under the pseudonym "Anonymous" on Nuclear Blast Records in 1994, followed by a re-release on Rowe Productions. The title "Hellig Usvart" is Norwegian, a fact which at first led many to believe that Horde originated in Norway, a theory backed up by the grim production quality on the album, considered to be a trademark of Norwegian black metal.

Upon the initial release of Hellig Usvart, a publicity campaign was launched throughout the black metal community, revolving around Sherlock being credited as "Anonymous", a play on Euronymous. Death-threats were sent to Mark Staiger at Nuclear Blast to reveal the identity of the anonymous musician who had created the album; later the musician was revealed to be Jayson Sherlock.

Hellig Usvart pioneered the previously unheard-of genre of "Christian black metal" (sometimes referred to as "Holy UnBlack Metal" as Sherlock called his music). Since its release, bands such as Dark Endless (also a black metal band with one anonymous member), Crimson Moonlight and Antestor have emerged as proponents of Christian black metal.

Revulsed

In 2010 Jayson and Sheldon D'Costa left inExordium to form Revulsed, a faster and more technical and extreme death metal band based in Melbourne. In 2014 they acquired the services of Konni from Defeated Sanity and Despondency to perform the vocals for the debut album Infernal Atrocity released through Permeated Records on 31 October 2015. In 2017, Revulsed released Live Atrocity - The Inception of Sufferance, through Brutal Mind, It featured Damien Miriklis on vocals and Mark Smith on bass guitar.

Other projects
Sherlock is also involved in a number of other bands. In 2000 he joined the band Soundscape and in 2002 he joined the band Where Shadows Lie. In 2006 he rejoined the doom metal band Paramaecium and appeared at the '06 Black Stump festival. In 2007 they went to the NordicFest in Oslo, Norway which was to be Paramaecium's final show before the creation of InExordium by the remaining members of the band. Sherlock is also part of a progressive metal band called Altera Enigma, in which Jason De Ron (Paramaecium, InExordium) is also involved. In 2009 Jayson recorded as guest drummer for Fearscape's Nightmare Hymn (to be released mid-2009 on Bombworks Records). In mid-2009, Jayson was asked to fill in for Teramaze drummer Julian Percy as Julian was unable to fulfill commitments due to a chronic heart condition. Jayson has since fulfilled his commitments with the band, and they now have a permanent drummer. Jayson joined the band Deliverance to record the album Hear What I Say!.

Digital graphic artist
Sherlock was known to illustrate the cover art for most of his bands' albums. He created the artwork for Mortification's albums during 1990–1993 and designed a number of their T-shirts. These works are characterised by their underground approach, which is typical for death metal music. He also created artwork for Paramaecium's debut, which showcases detailed calligraphy artwork, and Horde's Hellig Usvart, among others. Eventually Sherlock became a professional digital graphic artist.

Bands

Current
 Revulsed – drums (2010–present)

Former
 Lightforce – drums (1990)
 Mortification – drums (1990–1993)
 Paramaecium – drums (1993–1996)
 Beheadoth – drums, vocals, guitars, bass, keyboards (1994)
 Horde – vocals, drums (1994, 2006, 2012), guitars, bass, keyboards (1994)
 Altera Enigma – drums (2004–2006)
 Where Shadows Lie – drums (2002–2004)
 Generator – drums
 Soundscape – drums (1999–2007)
 Deliverance – drums (2012–2014)

Discography

Mortification

 Break the Curse – (1990)
 Mortification – (1991)
 Scrolls of the Megilloth – (1992)
 Post Momentary Affliction – (1993)
 Live Planetarium – (1993)
 The Best of Five Years – (1995)
 Grind Planets DVD – (2005)
 Live Planetarium album and DVD – (2006)
 Ancient Prophecy/Overseer EP – (2017)

Paramaecium

 Exhumed of the Earth – (1993)
 Within the Ancient Forest – (1996)
 Repentance (EP) – (1997)

Horde

 Hellig Usvart – (1994)
 Alive in Oslo album and DVD – (2007)

Soundscape
 Soundscape – (2007)

inExordium
 inExordium – (2008)

Fearscape
 Nightmare Hymn – (2009)

Altera Enigma
 Angular Momentum – (Not Released)

Ursula
 Awakening – (2012)

Revulsed
 Infernal Atrocity – (2015)
 Live Atrocity – The Inception of Suffering – (2017)

Deliverance
 Hear What I Say! – (2013)

Further reading
 Interview in HM Magazine No. 65

References

External links
Jayson Sherlock at MySpace
Jayson Sherlock at inexordium.com

1969 births
Australian performers of Christian music
Living people
Australian heavy metal bass guitarists
Australian heavy metal singers
Australian Christians
Australian heavy metal drummers
Christian metal musicians
Mortification (band) members
Paramaecium members
Altera Enigma members